Norwalk Community School District is a public school district in Norwalk, Iowa. The Norwalk Community School District Central office is located at 380 Wright Road in Norwalk, Iowa 50211.

The district covers area of northern Warren County including almost all of Norwalk, Cumming, a small section of West Des Moines, and small portions of Des Moines.

Norwalk Public Schools
Norwalk Schools serves approximately 3,300 students each school year (2019–20).
 

Norwalk maintains five facilities:

Oviatt Elementary (PreK-1)
Orchard Hills Elementary (grades 2–3)
Lakewood Elementary (grades 4–5)
Norwalk Middle School (grades 6–8) 
Norwalk High School (grades 9–12)

General District Statistics
Per capita income: $22,609 
Median family income: $64,688 
Median male income: $34,306 
Median female income: $23,594 
Median income of a renter: $33,026 
Median income of a home owner: $64,639

Enrollment

See also
List of school districts in Iowa

References

External links
 Norwalk Community Schools homepage

Education in Warren County, Iowa
School districts established in 1960
School districts in Iowa
1960 establishments in Iowa